are small iron or hardened leather, hexagon shaped armour plates used in the construction of Japanese armor worn by samurai and ashigaru (foot soldiers) of feudal Japan.

Description and use
Kikkō refers to the shell of the tortoise or turtle which is formed from small hexagon plates. Individual kikko armour plates were attached to armour by sewing the kikko to a cloth lining through holes drilled in the center or edges of the kikko. Kikko could be sewn between two layers of cloth and hidden from sight. The kikko could be attached to each other by links of chainmail holes drilled in the edges of the kikko. Kikko armor was made for every class of samurai or soldier, high or low.

George Cameron Stone referred to kikko as "brigandine" when he said "in Japan brigandines were often used". He further described this "brigandine" as "small hexagons", "the plates [being] of steel or hard leather", and that "occasionally they covered the whole body".

Use
Kikko were used in the construction of traditional Japanese armour, suneate (greaves) and tate-eri (shoulder pads) often incorporated kikko in their design. Haidate (thigh guards) and kote (sleeves) could also be partially or completely armoured with kikko. Lightweight portable folding armour (kikko tatami gusoku) would have a [[Commons:Category:Kikko tatami dou (dō)|kikko tatami dō"']] (folding breastplate), and auxiliary armour items such as wakibiki, manchira, and manju no wa could be armoured with kikko. Kabuto (helmets) could have a neck guard (shikoro)  made with kikko plates sewn to a cloth backing.

Ian Bottomley in his book titled Arms and armor of the samurai: the history of weaponry in ancient Japan'', shows a forehead protector ("hitai ate") with a kikko hood, and calls the kikko chest armor ("kikko gane do") a form of "tatami", or folding armor.

Gallery

See also

Tatami (Japanese armour)
Brigandine
Chainmail
Plated mail
Japanese armour
Karuta (Japanese armour)
Kusari (Japanese mail armour)

References

External links
Anthony Bryant's online Japanese armour manual

Japanese armour
Samurai armour